Vision Air Malaysia Sdn Bhd (doing business as Vision Air Malaysia) was a regional charter service operating in Malaysia.It was a subsidiary of Vision Air, a regional carrier based in the USA.

At the end of their operation, they have operated 2 Dornier 228 aircraft, both of the aircraft were later transferred to Hornbill Skyways.

Destinations
 Miri (Miri Airport) (Main Hub)
 Mulu (Mulu Airport)
 Kota Kinabalu (Kota Kinabalu International Airport)

2001 establishments in Malaysia
2003 disestablishments in Malaysia
Defunct airlines of Malaysia
Airlines established in 2001
Airlines disestablished in 2003